The Urlui is a left tributary of the river Călmățui in Romania. It discharges into the Călmățui near Voievoda.

References

Rivers of Teleorman County
Rivers of Romania